The Kingdom of Denmark is a sovereign state comprising three constituent countries: Denmark, Greenland and the Faroe Islands that competed at the 2018 Winter Olympics in Pyeongchang, South Korea, from 9 to 25 February 2018, with 17 competitors in 5 sports. On 9 January 2018, speed skater Elena Møller Rigas was named as the country's flagbearer during the opening ceremony.

Competitors
The following is the list of number of competitors participating at the Games per sport/discipline.

Alpine skiing 

Denmark qualified one athlete, and received one additional quota place.

Cross-country skiing 

Denmark qualified one male athlete.

Distance

Curling  

Denmark qualified both a men's and a women's team by qualifying via the qualification event in Plzeň, Czech Republic.

Summary

Men's tournament

Round-robin
Denmark has a bye in draws 2, 6 and 10.

Draw 1
Wednesday, 14 February, 09:05

Draw 3
Thursday, 15 February, 14:05

Draw 4
Friday, 16 February, 09:05

Draw 5
Friday, 16 February, 20:05

Draw 7
Sunday, 18 February, 09:05

Draw 8
Sunday, 18 February, 20:05

Draw 9
Monday, 19 February, 14:05

Draw 11
Tuesday, 20 February, 20:05

Draw 12
Wednesday, 21 February, 14:05

Women's tournament

Round-robin
Denmark has a bye in draws 3, 7 and 10.

Draw 1
Wednesday, 14 February, 14:05

Draw 2
Thursday, 15 February, 09:05

Draw 4
Friday, 16 February, 14:05

Draw 5
Saturday, 17 February, 09:05

Draw 6
Saturday, 17 February, 20:05

Draw 8
Monday, 19 February, 09:05

Draw 9
Monday, 19 February, 20:05

Draw 11
Wednesday, 21 February, 09:05

Draw 12
Wednesday, 21 February, 20:05

Freestyle skiing 

Denmark has qualified one athlete in Freestyle Skiing.

Halfpipe

Speed skating

Denmark earned the following quotas at the conclusion of the four World Cups used for qualification. The Danish speed skating team consists of two male and one female athlete.

Mass start

Non-competing sports

Figure skating

Denmark qualified an ice dancing pair, based on its placement at the 2017 World Figure Skating Championships in Helsinki, Finland. However they relinquished their allocation because Laurence Fournier Beaudry was unable to obtain clearance to participate for Denmark, because he is Canadian, not Danish.

References

Nations at the 2018 Winter Olympics
2018
Winter Olympics